Dhamma Joti is one of the first Vipassana meditation centres in Myanmar, founded by S.N Goenka in the tradition of Sayagyi U Ba Kin in accordance with the teaching of Ledi Sayadaw. The centre is situated on an area about 12 acres contributed by the venerable Bhaddanta Sobhita of Wingabar Yele Monastery. It has been conducting Vipassana meditation courses since October 1993. The courses include 10 days for new students, and 3 days, 7 days and Sunday group sitting for old students.

References

Buddhism in Myanmar
Buddhist meditation
Yangon